John Fenton Johnson is an American writer and professor of English and LGBT Studies at the University of Arizona.

Life

He was born ninth of nine children into a Kentucky whiskey-making family with a strong storytelling tradition.

In February 2016, University Press of Kentucky marked Fenton Johnson's place in the literature of the state, region, and nation by publishing a new novel, The Man Who Loved Birds, at the same time that it reissues his earlier novels Crossing the River and Scissors, Paper, Rock.  Johnson is also the author of three cover essays in Harper's Magazine, most recently (April, 2015) Going It Alone:  The Dignity and Challenge of Solitude, available for reading through his webpage.  Links to his media appearances, on Terry Gross's Fresh Air and on Kentucky Educational Television, may be found on his webpage.

His most recent nonfiction book Keeping Faith:  A Skeptic's Journey draws on time spent living as a member of the monastic communities of the Trappist Abbey of Gethsemani in Kentucky and the San Francisco Zen Center as a means to examining what it means to a skeptic to have and keep faith.  Keeping Faith weaves frank conversations with Trappist and Buddhist monks with a history of the contemplative life and meditations from Johnson's experience of the virtue we call faith.  It received the 2004 Kentucky Literary Award for Nonfiction and the 2004 Lambda Literary Award for best GLBT creative nonfiction.

Johnson is also the author of Geography of the Heart:  A Memoir(1996) which received a Lambda Literary Award and the American Library Association Award for best gay/lesbian nonfiction.

Everywhere Home:  A Life in Essays, a compilation of Johnson's new and selected essays,  will be published in 2017.  He is currently at work on At the Center of All Beauty:  The Dignity and Challenge of Solitude, a book-length meditation based on his 2016 cover essay in Harper's Magazine.

Awards
He has received awards from the Wallace Stegner and James Michener Fellowships in Fiction and National Endowment for the Arts Fellowships in both fiction and creative nonfiction.  He has also received a Kentucky Literary Award, two Lambda Literary Awards for best creative nonfiction, as well as the American Library Association's Stonewall Book Award for best gay/lesbian nonfiction.  He received a 2007 fellowship from the John Simon Guggenheim Foundation to support completion of his third novel and to begin research and writing on a nonfiction project.

Bibliography

Novels
 
 
 Scissors, Paper, Rock (1994), Washington Square Press; (February, 2016) University Press of Kentucky 
 The Man Who Loved Birds (February, 2016), University Press of Kentucky

Memoirs
 Geography of the Heart: A Memoir (1996), Scribner's; (1997) Washington Square Press.

Nonfiction 
 ; (2005) Mariner Books.
 Everywhere Home: A Life in Essays, Sarabande Books (2017)

References

External links

 KYLIT - A site devoted to Kentucky Writers A biography of Johnson's life
 "Author's website"

1953 births
Living people
20th-century American novelists
American male non-fiction writers
American male novelists
20th-century American memoirists
American gay writers
Harper's Magazine people
Gay memoirists
American LGBT novelists
LGBT people from Kentucky
Lambda Literary Award winners
Stonewall Book Award winners
Novelists from Kentucky
San Francisco Zen Center
20th-century American male writers
LGBT educators